The Catholic Church in Taiwan is part of the worldwide Catholic Church, under the spiritual leadership of the Pope in Rome. Between 1.5% and 2% of the population of Taiwan are Catholic. The Church operates one university, the Fu Jen Catholic University.

History
In 1514, Taiwan was included in the Diocese of Funchal as a missionary jurisdiction; there was some organized Catholic activity on the island. In 1576, the first Chinese diocese, the Diocese of Macau, was established in Macau, a Portuguese colony, and covered most of China including Taiwan. The diocese of Macau was sub-divided several times over the next few centuries. In 1626, Northern Taiwan became a Spanish colony. In 1631, Jacinto Esquivel, a Spanish Dominican friar, built a church in Northern Taiwan. In chronological order, Taiwan belonged to the Archdiocese of Manila (1627), the Apostolic Vicariate (now Archdiocese) of Nanjing (1660), the Apostolic Vicariate of Fujian (now the Archdiocese of Fuzhou) (1696) and the Apostolic Vicariate (now Diocese) of Xiamen (1883).

In 1913, the Apostolic Prefecture of the Island of Taiwan (then called Formosa in foreign languages) was established out of the Diocese of Xiamen. It was renamed Apostolic Prefecture of Kaohsiung (Gaoxiong) in 1949, when the Apostolic Prefecture of Taipei (now the Archdiocese of Taipei) was established out of its territory.

Before the end of World War II the Catholic Church had a very minor presence in Taiwan, based mainly in the south of the island and centred on Spanish Dominican priests who went there from the Philippines in the 1860s. The end of World War II and the following years saw a mass migration of religious communities from mainland China as Communist persecution began to take effect following the Chinese Communist Revolution in 1949. As a result, the Catholic Church has many Mandarin-speaking emigrants from the mainland.

In September 1951 the Papal Internuncio to China was expelled to Hong Kong. Since 1952, the Papal internuncio has been stationed in Taiwan (Republic of China). Also, the ROC ambassador to the Holy See has provided the only permanent diplomatic link between China and the Holy See. Attempts to move the Papal nuncio to Beijing have failed, as the Holy See has not accepted demands by the People's Republic of China that it sever its diplomatic links with Taiwan.

The current archbishop of Taipei is the Most Reverend Thomas Chung An-Zu (鐘安住), who was appointed on 23 May 2020  to succeed John Hung Shan-chuan (洪山川), S.V.D., who retired in the same year.

On 19 February 2021, Pope Francis formally granted a decree of canonical coronation for a Marian image of Our Lady of China, currently venerated at the National Shrine of Our Lady of China in Chiayi County, Taiwan.

Dioceses
Archdiocese of Taipei (台北) founded 1949, archdiocese since 1952
Diocese of Kaohsiung (高雄), founded 1913, renamed and upgraded 1949 and 1961
Diocese of Taichung (台中), founded 1951, upgraded 1962
Diocese of Chiayi (嘉義), founded 1952, upgraded 1962
Diocese of Hwalien (花蓮), founded 1952, upgraded 1963
Diocese of Hsinchu (新竹), founded 1961
Diocese of Tainan (台南), founded 1961
Kinma Apostolic Administration (金馬), founded 1968

See also

 Catholic Church in China
 Catholic Church in Hong Kong
 Catholic Church in Macau
 Chinese Rites Controversy
 Christianity in Taiwan
 Holy See–Taiwan relations

References

External links

 Chinese Regional Bishops' Conference
 The Catholic Church in TW by GCatholic.org
 Shamanism and Catholic Indigenous Communities in Taiwan

 
Taiwan